

Qualification
A total of 109 taekwondo athletes will qualify to compete at the games. The top twelve athletes, along with the host nation per weight category, excluding the women's +67 kg (which will qualify only 8 athletes) will qualify at qualification tournament in March 2015. A further nine wildcards (five male, four female) will be distributed by the Pan American Taekwondo Union, to countries which did not qualify any athletes in the qualification tournament. Only five nations did qualify any athletes, which allowed for four countries to receive an additional quota through a wildcard.

Qualification timeline

Qualification summary

Men

58 kg

68 kg

80 kg

+80 kg

Women

49 kg

The Argentinian athlete tested positive for doping, and Venezuela was given a wildcard to replace her.

57 kg

67 kg

The Bolivian athlete was murdered and thus the nation decided to not use the wildcard spot.

+67 kg

References

P
Qualification for the 2015 Pan American Games
Taekwondo at the 2015 Pan American Games